Tenkodogo is a department or commune of Boulgou Province in eastern Burkina Faso. Its capital is the town of Tenkodogo. According to the 2019 census the department has a total population of 157,947.

Towns and villages

Tenkodogo (61 936 inhabitants) (capital)
 Bado (749 inhabitants)
 Baleme (455 inhabitants)
 Bampela (635 inhabitants)
 Basbedo (951 inhabitants)
 Baskoure (446 inhabitants)
 Bassare (669 inhabitants)
 Belce (428 inhabitants)
 Bidiga (764 inhabitants)
 Bissiga De Gando (279 inhabitants)
 Boura (972 inhabitants)
 Cella (1 731 inhabitants)
 Cella De Loanga (421 inhabitants)
 Daze, Burkina Faso (254 inhabitants)
 Donsene (166 inhabitants)
 Donsene-Yarce (492 inhabitants)
 Doubguin-Ouantanghin (1 739 inhabitants)
 Doure (319 inhabitants)
 Gando I (432 inhabitants)
 Gando Ii (398 inhabitants)
 Gambaghin (987 inhabitants)
 Gaskom (472 inhabitants)
 Gouni-Peulh (327 inhabitants)
 Guella (706 inhabitants)
 Kabri (662 inhabitants)
 Kampoaga (3 705 inhabitants)
 Kassougou (314 inhabitants)
 Koama (745 inhabitants)
 Kokoaga-Ouest (789 inhabitants)
 Kou (678 inhabitants)
 Koughin (678 inhabitants)
 Koknoghin (796 inhabitants)
 Labretenga (576 inhabitants)
 Lebce (298 inhabitants)
 Leda, Burkina Faso (1 591 inhabitants)
 Loanga (2 580 inhabitants)
 Loanga Peulh (840 inhabitants)
 Loukou (1 991 inhabitants)
 Loukou-Peulh (147 inhabitants)
 Malenga-Nagsore (3 340 inhabitants)
 Malenga-Yarce (1 103 inhabitants)
 Milla (481 inhabitants)
 Moaga (397 inhabitants)
 Naba-Sougdin (404 inhabitants)
 Nama (792 inhabitants)
 Ningare (2 160 inhabitants)
 Ouamne (556 inhabitants)
 Ouanagou (1 065 inhabitants)
 Oueguedo (1 194 inhabitants)
 Oueguedo-Peulh (130 inhabitants)
 Oueguedo-Yarce (179 inhabitants)
 Oueloghin (1 961 inhabitants)
 Ounzeogo (2 241 inhabitants)
 Ounzeogo-Peulh (147 inhabitants)
 Ourema (1 192 inhabitants)
 Piougou (228 inhabitants)
 Piroukou (1 354 inhabitants)
 Pouswaka (1 527 inhabitants)
 Pouswaka-Peulh (792 inhabitants)
 Sabtenga (3 314 inhabitants)
 Sago, Burkina Faso (389 inhabitants)
 Sampa (684 inhabitants)
 Sassema (2 197 inhabitants)
 Sassema-Peulh (181 inhabitants)
 Sebretenga (494 inhabitants)
 Sebretenga De Godin (1 093 inhabitants)
 Sigriyaoghin (896 inhabitants)
 Silmiougou (685 inhabitants)
 Sone (282 inhabitants)
 Sorbin (297 inhabitants)
 Soumagou (1 074 inhabitants)
 Tenonghin (1 264 inhabitants)
 Tenonghin-Peulh (637 inhabitants)
 Teodoure (337 inhabitants)
 Tisselin (1 242 inhabitants)
 Tisselin-Yarce (167 inhabitants)
 Toghin (641 inhabitants)
 Vag-Vaguin (1 366 inhabitants)
 Zabatorla (522 inhabitants)
 Zaka (896 inhabitants)
 Zandoubre (261 inhabitants)
 Zano (1 543 inhabitants)
 Zeke (872 inhabitants)
 Zoromdougou (264 inhabitants)

References

Departments of Burkina Faso
Boulgou Province

it:Tenkodogo